In cricket, a batsman reaches a century when he scores 100 or more runs in a single innings. A century is regarded as a landmark score for a batsman, and his number of centuries is generally recorded in his career statistics. The Bangladesh Premier League (BPL) is a professional Twenty20 cricket league in Bangladesh which has been held annually since its first season in 2012. Though Following the match fixing scandal, the league was not played in the year 2014. It started again at year 2015, the third season of this tournament. In the eight seasons played, twenty-five centuries has been made by eighteen different players.

The first century in the BPL was scored in the first match on 10 February 2012 at Sher-e-Bangla National Cricket Stadium, Dhaka by Chris Gayle for Barisal Burners against Sylhet Royals. The highest score in the competition was made by Chris Gayle, who scored 146 runs not out for Rangpur Riders against Dhaka Dynamites. The fastest century in terms of balls was scored by Chris Gayle, who scored 126 runs not out in 51 balls while playing for Ranhpur Riders. The slowest century was scored by Dwayne Smith for Khulna Royal Bengal against Sylhet Royals. He scored his century in 70 balls while his final score was 103 runs not out in 73 balls at a strike rate of 141.09.

The highest number of centuries have been scored by Chris Gayle with five centuries.

Among the twenty-five centuries only six of them are made by the player of the hosting country. Nineteen centuries has been scored by the foreigner players with twelve from West Indies players.

Mohammad Ashraful, Shahriar Nafees and Faf du Plessis are the only players to score a century while captaining their team. Ashraful was the captain of Dhaka Gladiators side while Nafees was the captain of Khulna Royal Bengal and Faf du Plessis captaining Comilla Victorians. 2019 BPL, also known as BPL6 has seen the most number of centuries. Six centuries had been scored on that season. While 2015 and 2016 has the lowest number of centuries with one each.

Key

Centuries

Season overview

References 

Bangladesh Premier League lists